Road I/50 is a first class road in Slovakia. It is the longest numbered road in Slovakia, with a total length of 403,8 km and it crosses the country from  the northwest to the east. Road sections are the parts of European roads E50, E58, E71, E77, E571 and E572.  
Expressway R2 is planned to be constructed on the most parts of the road section to relieve the rising traffic.  Most of the road part is two laned, ca. 20 km section between Žiar nad Hronom and Zvolen is four laned plus emergency lane in both directions and a section between Nováky and Prievidza. Also before entering Košice is ca. 17 km long four laned section.
The road crosses Trenčiansky, Banskobystrický and Košický kraj.

Main cities on the I/50 route 

 Bánovce nad Bebravou
 Nováky
 Prievidza
 Handlová
 Žiar nad Hronom
 Zvolen
 Detva
 Lučenec
 Rimavská Sobota
 Tornaľa
 Rožňava
 Moldava nad Bodvou
 Košice
 Sečovce
 Michalovce
 Sobrance

See also
 Highway M08 (Ukraine)

References 

Highways in Slovakia